Foreign relations exist between Azerbaijan and Poland. The embassy of Poland opened in Azerbaijan on August 23, 2001, and the Azerbaijani Embassy in Poland on August 30, 2004. Both countries are full members of the Council of Europe and the Organization for Security and Co-operation in Europe (OSCE).

At present over a thousand of self-identified Poles in Azerbaijan.

Historical relations 
Polish Ledinski and Azerbaijani Alimardan Topchubashov founded a special group together in the Duma to struggle for the autonomy of Poland and Azerbaijan. When Mammed Amin Rasulzade founded Azerbaijan Democratic Republic in 1918, which was the first secular and democratic republic in the Muslim world, the first chief of staff of the national army became Polish general Maciej Sulkiewicz. It is also notable that Rasulzade went to Poland in 1938 and he met his second wife Wanda who was a niece of Polish statesman Józef Piłsudski. During the Katyn massacre, Hamid Mahammadzadeh, an ethnic Azeri member of the Polish Officer Corps, was among 22,000 Polish nationals shot down by the NKVD, the Soviet secret police, in 1940.

Recent political relations 

Poland recognized Azerbaijan's independence on December 27, 1991. Though intensive diplomatic contacts developed only few years later when Heydar Aliyev visited Poland in August 1997 and then Polish President Aleksander Kwaśniewski visited to Azerbaijan in October 1999. Poland backed Azerbaijan for membership in both the Council of Europe and the World Trade Organization and declared its interest in participating in various energy projects. Poland supports Azerbaijan's bid to join the European Union and NATO. and through the Nagorno-Karabakh conflict against Armenia, Poland supported Azerbaijan although it is sporadic due to later recognition of Armenian genocide by Poland in which Azerbaijan protested against. Poland is able to have a friendly relations with Armenia, but close relations with Azerbaijan and Polish Government's recent decision for its citizens to ask permission from Azerbaijan before visiting the Nagorno-Karabakh region resulted in the Polish government's decision being described as "anti-Armenian" by Armenian nationalist groups and youth organizations.

Poland's then President Lech Kaczyński visited Azerbaijan in 2007, and on February 26, 2008 President of Azerbaijan Ilham Aliyev paid a visit to Poland. A joint statement of both was signed during the visit. The statement noted that Poland supports the peaceful settlement of the conflict in the frames of sovereignty, territorial integrity and inviolability of borders, and in the framework of the Charter of the United Nations. Kaczyński was decorated with Order of Heydar Aliyev for his special services in the development of the relations at his fifth visit.

Economic relations 

In 2008, for the first time in the history of its economic relations Azerbaijan gained trade surplus, and turnover of goods between the two countries reached $166.9 million. "Sarmatiya" company has been established to prepare technical details of Baku-Odessa-Brody-Płock-Gdańsk pipeline which seemed to be a legend for many years. It shows the increasing role of Azerbaijan in ensuring energy security of Poland.

Cultural relations 
In the middle of the 19th century the Azerbaijani heroic epos Koroghlu was translated by Aleksander Chodźko and published in English and French. Warsaw remains as the last place Abbasgulu Bakikhanov visited before his retiring. He wrote a whole number of poems and his famous "Asrar al-Malakut" (The Secrets of Heavens in the Arabic language) in Warsaw.

Ismayil Gutgashinli's "Rashid bey and Saadat khanum", which is notable for being the first Azerbaijani realistic prose, was published first in Poland in 1835. 

Józef Gosławski, Józef Płoszko, Eugeniusz Skibiński and Kazimierz Skórewicz are notable for being the architects of a number of buildings in Azerbaijan. Ismailiyya Palace, Palace of Happiness, Building of Baku City Executive Power, Rylsky brothers' house, Agabala Guliyev's House, Tagiyev's Passage and present-day National Museum of History of Azerbaijan, Baku Puppet Theatre, Institute of Manuscripts and History Museum of the Prosecutor's Office are among them.

Polish Security Printing Works also supported Chopin Year 2010 and Milosz Year 2011 in Azerbaijan. The Center for Polish Language and Culture at the Baku Slavic University was opened on November 9, 2006. Polish engineer Paweł Potocki presented the first project of oil extraction in the Caspian shelf and ensured its fulfillment.

Resident diplomatic missions 
 Azerbaijan has an embassy in Warsaw.
 Poland has an embassy in Baku.

See also  
 Foreign relations of Azerbaijan 
 Foreign relations of Poland 
 Armenia–Poland relations
 Church of the Immaculate Conception, Baku
 The Spring to Come
 Ziya Bunyadov
 Tadeusz Swietochowski 
 Azerbaijan–EU relations
 Azerbaijanis in Poland
 Poles in Azerbaijan

References

External links 
 Embassy of Poland in Azerbaijan Official website
 Embassy of Azerbaijan in Poland Official website
 Embassy of Azerbaijan in Poland
 Embassy of Poland in Azerbaijan

 
Poland
Bilateral relations of Poland